Ma Shuai (born 12 May 1998) is a Chinese footballer currently playing as a midfielder for Zibo Cuju.

Club career
In 2021, during his time with Shandong Taishan, Ma helped out at a special education school alongside teammate Gao Shuo.

Career statistics

Club

Notes

References

1998 births
Living people
Chinese footballers
Chinese expatriate footballers
Association football midfielders
Shandong Taishan F.C. players
Zibo Cuju F.C. players
China League One players
Chinese expatriate sportspeople in Brazil
Expatriate footballers in Brazil